Kamil Szymura (born 16 August 1990) is a Polish professional footballer who plays for GKS Tychy as centre-back.

Career

Club
In the summer 2010, he was loaned to Ruch Radzionków from Górnik Zabrze. He returned to Górnik one year later. In 2013, he signed a contract with GKS Jastrzębie.

In 2018–19, he appeared in I liga 22 times and scored 7 goals.

On 1 August 2020, he signed a two-year contract with GKS Tychy.

References

External links
 

1990 births
People from Jastrzębie-Zdrój
Sportspeople from Silesian Voivodeship
Living people
Polish footballers
Poland under-21 international footballers
Association football defenders
Górnik Zabrze players
Ruch Radzionków players
GKS Katowice players
Sandecja Nowy Sącz players
GKS Jastrzębie players
GKS Tychy players
Ekstraklasa players
I liga players
II liga players
III liga players